HD 111031 (50 G. Corvi) is a double star in the southern constellation of Corvus. With an apparent visual magnitude of 6.87, it is considered too faint to be readily visible to the naked eye. The distance to this star is 102 light years, but it is drifting closer to the Sun with a radial velocity of −20 km/s. It has an absolute magnitude of 4.42.

This object is a solar analog with a stellar classification of G5 V; a G-type main-sequence star like the Sun that is generating energy through core hydrogen fusion. It is around five billion years old and is chromospherically inactive, with a projected rotational velocity of 1.7 km/s. The star has 1.13 times the mass and 1.27 times the radius of the Sun. It is radiating 1.5 times the Sun's luminosity from its photosphere at an effective temperature of 5,836 K.

In 2020, a stellar companion was identified using high-contrast imaging. An independent study published in 2021 identified a companion through speckle imaging. They propose this is a faint red dwarf with a class of M6 or later and a visual magnitude difference of 7.9 or more compared to the primary. It is located at a separation of  along a PA of 121°, as of 2021.

In 2022, the presence of a brown dwarf companion to this star was confirmed.

References

G-type main-sequence stars
Double stars

Corvus (constellation)
Durchmusterung objects
3746
Corvi, 50
111031
062345